Johanna "Hanni" Gehring (15 August 1926 – 24 March 2011) was a German cross-country skier during the 1950s. She finished 13th in the 10 km event at the 1952 Winter Olympics in Oslo.

Cross-country skiing results

Olympic Games

External links
German national champions - women's cross country skiing 
Hanni Gehring's obituary 

Olympic cross-country skiers of Germany
Cross-country skiers at the 1952 Winter Olympics
German female cross-country skiers
1926 births
2011 deaths